Pavel Lyakhnovich (born 7 January 1997) is a Belarusian professional footballer who plays for Osipovichi.

References

External links 
 
 

1997 births
Living people
Belarusian footballers
Association football midfielders
FC BATE Borisov players
FC Smolevichi players
FC Luch Minsk (2012) players
FC Krumkachy Minsk players
FC Chist players
FC Smorgon players
FC Uzda players
FC Oshmyany players
FC Viktoryja Marjina Horka players
FC Osipovichi players